Joseph Pere Bell Wilmer (February 11, 1812 – December 2, 1878) was the second Episcopal bishop of Louisiana.

Early life
Joseph Wilmer was born in Swedesboro, New Jersey, United States, in 1812, the son of the Rev. Simon (himself son of the Rev. Simon and uncle of Bishop Richard Hooker Wilmer) and Rebecca (Frisby) Wilmer.  He attended the University of Virginia, where he graduated in 1831; Kenyon College, where he graduated in 1833; and Virginia Theological Seminary, where he graduated in 1834.  In 1857, he received the degree of D.D. from Union College in Schenectady, New York. Wilmer was ordained a deacon in the Episcopal Church on July 10, 1834, in St. Paul's Episcopal Church in Alexandria, Virginia, by Bishop Richard Channing Moore of Virginia. He was ordained a priest by the same bishop at St. Paul's Episcopal Church in Petersburg, Virginia, in May 1838.  He married Helen Skipwith, the daughter of Humburston and Sarah (Nevison) Skipwith, with whom he had six children.

Ordained ministry
Wilmer began his ordained ministry by serving at St. Anne's Parish in Albemarle, Virginia, from 1834 to 1838.  The following year he served as the chaplain at his alma mater, the University of Virginia.  In 1839, he was appointed chaplain in the United States Army.  He resigned from the army in 1843 to take charge of Hungars Parish in Northampton County, Virginia.  After that he served as rector of St. Paul's Episcopal Church in Goochland County, Virginia, until 1848, when he became rector of St. Mark's Episcopal Church in Philadelphia, Pennsylvania.  He served there until the breakout of the Civil War in 1861, when he retired to his estate in Virginia.

Episcopate
His cousin Richard Hooker Wilmer was elected Bishop of Alabama by the Protestant Episcopal Church in the Confederate States of America during the American Civil War, and, although Richard Wilmer was unable to attend the first General Convention after the war, his consecration was ratified by the reunited church.

In May 1866, Joseph Wilmer was elected as the second bishop of the Diocese of Louisiana, succeeding Bishop (and General) Leonidas Polk, who had died during the siege of Atlanta in 1864.  He was consecrated as bishop in Christ Church, New Orleans, on November 7, 1866, by Presiding Bishop John Henry Hopkins, as well as Bishops William Mercer Green, Richard Hooker Wilmer (his cousin), and Charles Todd Quintard.  During his episcopate, Bishop Wilmer grew the diocese, despite financial, flooding, and political troubles.  During his first eight years, the number of congregations, church buildings, and communicants in the diocese more than doubled.  Wilmer died suddenly of apoplexy in New Orleans on December 2, 1878.  He was buried at Green Mount Cemetery in Baltimore, Maryland.

Notes

References
 Batterson, Hermon Griswold (1891). A Sketch-book of the American Episcopate. Philadelphia: J. B. Lippencott & Co. Retrieved June 30, 2013.
 Duncan, Herman Cope (1888). The Diocese of Louisiana: Some of Its History, 1838-1888. New Orleans: A. W. Hyatt. Retrieved June 30, 2013.
 Hanson, George A. (1876). Old Kent: The Eastern Shore of Maryland. Baltimore: Clearfield. Retrieved June 30, 2013.

1812 births
1878 deaths
American bishops
Kenyon College alumni
People from Swedesboro, New Jersey
University of Virginia alumni
Virginia Theological Seminary alumni
Bishops in Louisiana
19th-century American Episcopalians
Episcopal bishops of Louisiana
19th-century American clergy